Marion Township is one of the thirteen townships of Henry County, Ohio, United States. As of the 2010 census the population was 1,297, of whom 721 lived in the unincorporated portion of the township.

Geography
Located in the southern part of the county, it borders the following townships:
Monroe Township - north
Richfield Township - northeast corner
Bartlow Township - east
Van Buren Township, Putnam County - southeast corner
Liberty Township, Putnam County - south
Palmer Township, Putnam County - southwest corner
Pleasant Township - west
Flatrock Township - northwest corner

The village of Hamler is located in northeastern Marion Township.

Name and history
It is one of twelve Marion Townships statewide.

Government
The township is governed by a three-member board of trustees, who are elected in November of odd-numbered years to a four-year term beginning on the following January 1. Two are elected in the year after the presidential election and one is elected in the year before it. There is also an elected township fiscal officer, who serves a four-year term beginning on April 1 of the year after the election, which is held in November of the year before the presidential election. Vacancies in the fiscal officership or on the board of trustees are filled by the remaining trustees.

References

External links
County website

Townships in Henry County, Ohio
Townships in Ohio